Raster graphics editors can be compared by many variables, including availability.

List

General information 

Basic general information about the editors: creator, company, license, etc.

Operating system support 

The operating systems on which the editors can run natively, that is, without emulation, virtual machines or compatibility layers. In other words, the software must be specifically coded for the operation system; for example, Adobe Photoshop for Windows running on Linux with Wine does not fit.

Features

Color spaces

File support

See also 

Raster graphics (also called bitmap)
Raster graphics editor
Comparison of graphics file formats
Vector graphics
Comparison of raster-to-vector conversion software
Comparison of vector graphics editors
Comparison of 3D computer graphics software
Comparison of image viewers

Notes

References

External links 

Raster graphics editors